is the 29th single by the Japanese female idol group Cute. It  was released in Japan on October 28, 2015, on the Zetima label.

Release 
It is a triple-A-sided single.

It was released in six versions: three limited ones (limited editions A, B, and C) and three regular ones (regular editions A, B, and C). All the regular editions were CD-only, while all the limited editions included an additional DVD.

Reception 
The physical CD single debuted at number 2 on the Oricon daily singles chart.

On the Oricon weekly singles chart, it debuted also at number 2.

Track listing

CD (all editions)

Charts

References

External links 
 Profile of the single on the Hello! Project official website
 Profile of the single on the Up-Front Works official website

2016 singles
Japanese-language songs
Cute (Japanese idol group) songs
Zetima Records singles
2016 songs